The Southern Museum of Flight is a civilian aviation museum Birmingham, Alabama.  The facility features nearly 100 aircraft, as well as engines, models, artifacts, photographs, and paintings.  In addition, the Southern Museum of Flight is home to the Alabama Aviation Hall of Fame, which presents Alabama Aviation History through collective biography.

Overview
Notable aircraft on display include a Wright Flyer, Curtis Pusher, Fokker D-VII, Alexander Eaglerock, F-4 Phantom, F-86 Sabre, AH-1 Cobra, Soviet-built MiGs, Mi-24 Hind, A-12 Blackbird spy plane, the "Lake Murray" B-25, and an array of experimental aircraft.  The Lake Murray B-25C Mitchell bomber crashed in South Carolina during a 1943 training exercise. The right engine was torn off during the crash but the crew was able to escape unharmed before she sank to a depth of 150 feet (46m). The aircraft became a dive site for local technical divers until she was raised from the depths of the lake in September 2005. Dr. Bob Seigler who spearheaded the project, John Hodge and Dr. Bill Vartorella, formed the Lake Murray B-25 Rescue Project to salvage the aircraft from the bottom of Lake Murray. After recovery the remains of the aircraft were moved to the Southern Museum of Flight in Birmingham, Alabama for conservation and museum display. A video crew, including maritime video experts from Nautilus Productions, documented the recovery for the Mega Movers series on the History Channel.

Featured on display is a diorama exhibit honoring Alabama's famed Tuskegee Airmen, as well as the Korean War Jets Exhibit and Vietnam War Helicopters Exhibit.

The museum is currently on the grounds of the Birmingham–Shuttlesworth International Airport but plans to reopen at the Grand River Technology Park.

Selected aircraft on display

 Aero Commander 680
 Aeronca K
 Aeronca Sedan on floats
 Bede BD-4
 Bede BD-5B
 Beagle B.206
 Beechcraft Starship
 Cessna 337B Skymaster
 Cumulus 2F Glider
 Curtiss Model D replica
 Davis DA-2A
 Douglas B-26 Invader
 Fairchild PT-19
 Fokker D.VII
 Grumman F-14 Tomcat
 Heath Super Parasol
 Huff-Daland crop duster
 Hughes OH-6 Cayuse
 Laister-Kauffman 10A
 Lockheed A-12
 Lockheed T-33A Shooting Star
 McDonnell F-4 Phantom II
 Mikoyan-Gurevich MiG-15
 Monnett Sonerai II-LT
 North American B-25C Mitchell
 North American F-86 Sabre
 North American T-6G Texan
 Pazmany PL-4A
 Piel Emeraude
 Piper PA-28-140 Cherokee Cruiser
 Republic F-84F Thunderstreak
 Republic RC-3 Seabee
 Rotec Rally
 Rutan VariViggen
 Sport Fury
 Stoddard-Hamilton Glasair II FT
 Stinson 10A
 Stinson SR-5
 Stolp Starduster
 Vultee BT-13B Valiant
 Wright Flyer replica

References

Notes

Bibliography 

 Barsanti, B. J. Interview with James T. Griffin (20 Jan 2013).
 Stevenson, E. W. "The History of the Southern Museum of Flight", SMF Trustee Manual, 15 May 2004.

External links

Southern Museum of Flight website
Alabama Aviation Hall of Fame  website
Lake Murray's B-25
Lake Murray's Mitchell
Podcast: Southern Museum of Flight
B-25 Recovery and Preservation Project Rubicon Foundation

Aerospace museums in Alabama
Museums in Birmingham, Alabama
Museums established in 1966
1966 establishments in Alabama
Birmingham–Shuttlesworth International Airport